Linden railway station is located on the Main Western line in New South Wales, Australia. It serves the Blue Mountains village of Linden opening in August 1874 as Linden Tank, being renamed Hendersons Platform on 26 October 1874 and Linden in 1879.

Platforms & services
Linden has one island platform with two sides. It is serviced by NSW TrainLink Blue Mountains Line services travelling from Sydney Central to Lithgow.

Transport links
Blue Mountains Transit operate two routes via Linden station:
685H: Springwood to Hazelbrook
690K: Springwood to Katoomba

References

External links

Linden station details Transport for New South Wales

Railway stations in Australia opened in 1874
Regional railway stations in New South Wales
Short-platform railway stations in New South Wales, 4 cars
Main Western railway line, New South Wales